The sacral spinal nerve 5 (S5) is a spinal nerve of the sacral segment.

It originates from the spinal column from below the 5th body of the sacrum. 

S5 supplies the Coccygeus muscle.

References

Spinal nerves